Marjonbuloq is an urban-type settlement in Gʻallaorol District, Jizzakh Region, Uzbekistan. The town's population was 3,079 people in 1989, and 5,700 in 2016.

References

Populated places in Jizzakh Region
Urban-type settlements in Uzbekistan